Lake Gregory - Mulan Airport  is an airport located in Mulan, serving Lake Gregory region, Western Australia.

See also
 List of airports in Western Australia
 Aviation transport in Australia

References

External links
Lake Gregory Airport on TheAirDB
 Airservices Aerodromes & Procedure Charts

Kimberley airports